FOSI, Forum Sedimentologiwan Indonesia / Indonesian Sedimentologists Forum sedimentological is a sedimentological section of the Indonesian Geologists Association (Ikatan Ahli Geologi Indonesia / IAGI), which was formed in 1995. The forum was accepted as the sedimentological commission of the Indonesian Association of Geologists (IAGI) in 1996. The first bulletin was issued in 1996, called Berita Sedimentologi (later became the "Indonesian Journal of Sedimentary Geology" but the original name is still kept in the cover). The bulletin was started as hard copies (paper prints) and in 2010 it has been changed to soft copies and downloadable from FOSI website. FOSI issued the bulletin three times a year.

The logo of FOSI has been introduced in 1999 during the 1st regional conference in Bandung, Indonesia. It has been used as a standard logo of the organization.
In 2015, FOSI commemorate its 20th anniversary and issued a publication pack, which contains the 33 Berita Sedimentologi bulletins issued in this period of time.

Seminars
FOSI has organized regional seminars:
 1999 - Tectonics and Sedimentation of Indonesian Basins, a 50 years memorial of R. W. Van Bemmelen's book: The Geology of Indonesia - venue: Institute of Technology, Bandung
 2001 - Deepwater Sedimentation of Southeast Asia - venue: Hotel Mulia, Jakarta

Awards
In 2000, a FOSI award was given to Dr. Surono (GRDC) as the most productive author on sedimentological topics in Indonesia.

External links
FOSI Website

Geology of Indonesia
Geology organizations